Allen William Thurman (May 1847– 15 November 1922) was president of the Ohio Board of Administration in 1912. He was president of the American Association in 1890 and 1891 where he was known as "The White Winged Angel of Peace", so called because he helped negotiate the end of the labor strife that had resulted in the formation of the Players' League and the weakening of the finances of organized baseball. He was replaced by Louis Kramer.

In 1889, he sought the Democratic nomination for Governor of Ohio. As a eugenicist he argued that "unless Ohio takes prompt measures to stop the production of imbeciles, within ten years it will be bankrupted by the cost of maintaining this part of its population."

Family
He was born in Chillicothe, Ohio, to US Representative (and later US Senator) Allen Granberry Thurman and Mary Anderson Dun. He married Harriet Webb (1846–1930) and had a son, Albert Lee Thurman (1869–1923).

References

1847 births
1922 deaths
American eugenicists
Baseball executives
People from Chillicothe, Ohio